Jim, Jimmy, James, or variation, Chou, Chu, Choo, or variant; may refer to:

People
 Jim Chou, former CTO of Shutterstock
 James J. Chou (born 1970), Chinese academic
 James C. Y. Chu (born 1935), Taiwanese politician
 Jim Chu (born 1959) former Chief Constable of Vancouver
 Jim Chu (entrepreneur), founder and CEO of dloHaiti
 Jimmy Choo Yeang Keat (born 1948; English: Jimmy Choo; ; Tai-lo: Tsiu Ióng-kia̍t; Choo Yeang Keat), British-Chinese-Malaysian fashion designer, founder of the eponymous fashion company

Other uses
 Jimmy Choo (company), British fashion company, founded by the eponymous fashion designer

See also
 James (disambiguation)
 Jimmy (disambiguation)
 Jim (disambiguation)
 Choo (disambiguation)
 Chou (disambiguation)
 Chu (disambiguation)